The women's marathon at the 2004 Summer Olympics took place on August 22 in the streets of Athens, Greece. These streets were recently painted for the event, which provided an excellent road surface for the athletes.  Drawing upon the ancient origins of the race, the marathon began in Marathon, Greece, and eventually ended at Panathinaiko Stadium, the venue previously used for the 1896 Athens Olympics.

The 42.2 kilometre (26.2 mile) journey began in Marathon and the race over the classic course began with temperatures exceeding 35 °C (95 °F). The top contenders all found themselves in a large leading group that held a modest pace through the half marathon. A few tried to surge ahead, but a pack of five runners had been separated from the rest of the field to maintain at the front as they passed the 20k mark.

World record holder Paula Radcliffe of Great Britain, who started out as a pre-race favorite coming into the Games, raised the tempo taking four others, including the Japanese duo Mizuki Noguchi and Reiko Tosa, with her to the front. Past 25k, Radcliffe struggled to keep her pace on an uphill stretch of the course and fell behind, leaving the two runners Noguchi and Ethiopia's Elfenesh Alemu to chase into the front with only half a minute apart from each other. At around 35k, Radcliffe launched a brave charge to recover her pace and challenge the leaders into the medal position, until Kenya's Catherine Ndereba managed to overtake her. Distraught and sobbing, Radcliffe tried to restart with 6k left to the finish, but then slumped on the roadside and quit the race, citing pre-race nutrition problems and injuries for her disappointing performance.

Heading to the Panathinaiko Stadium, Noguchi continued to escalate her lead, and edged past the late-charging Ndereba by twelve seconds to win the Olympic gold medal in 2:26:20. Noguchi's victory also marked the second consecutive gold for Japan in the women's marathon with Naoko Takahashi claiming the event in Sydney four years earlier.

Meanwhile, Deena Kastor of the United States came from behind to easily surpass the fading Alemu, and earn the first Olympic medal by an American female in the event since 1984.

Among the 82 starters, only sixty-six were able to successfully finish the race, with two left the track seeking for a medical attention.

Records
, the existing World and Olympic records were as follows.

No new records were set during the competition.

Qualification
The qualification period for athletics was 1 January 2003 to 9 August 2004. For the men's marathon, each National Olympic Committee was permitted to enter up to three athletes that had run the race in 2:37:00 or faster during the qualification period. If an NOC had no athletes that qualified under that standard, one athlete that had run the race in 2:42:00 or faster could be entered.

Schedule
All times are Greece Standard Time (UTC+2)

Results

References

External links
 IAAF Athens 2004 Olympic Coverage

W
Marathons at the Olympics
Summer Olympics
2004 Summer Olympics
Summer Olympics marathon
Women's events at the 2004 Summer Olympics
2004